Karen Morley (born Mildred Linton; December 12, 1909 – March 8, 2003) was an American film actress.

Life and career
Born Mildred Linton in Ottumwa, Iowa, Morley lived there until she was 13 years old. When she moved to Hollywood, she attended Hollywood High School.  She went on to attend the University of California, but she dropped out to join the Los Angeles Civic Repertory Theatre and the Pasadena Playhouse.

After working at the Pasadena Playhouse, she came to the attention of the director Clarence Brown, at a time when he had been looking for an actress to stand in for Greta Garbo in screen tests. This led to a contract with Metro-Goldwyn-Mayer and roles in films such as  Mata Hari (1931), Scarface (1932), The Phantom of Crestwood (1932), The Mask of Fu Manchu (1932), Arsene Lupin (1933), Gabriel Over the White House (1933), and Dinner at Eight (1933).

In 1934, Morley left MGM. Her first film after leaving the studio was Our Daily Bread (1934), directed by King Vidor. She continued to work as a freelance performer and appeared in Michael Curtiz's Black Fury, and The Littlest Rebel with Shirley Temple. Without the support of a studio, her roles became less frequent; however, she did play Mr. Collins' wife Charlotte Lucas in Pride and Prejudice (1940), which was produced by MGM. The film was critically well-received, but it did not advance her career; as a result, Morley turned her attention to stage plays.

In the early 1940s, she appeared in several plays on Broadway, including the role of Gerda in the original production of The Walrus and The Carpenter.

Her career came to an end in 1947 (November 1952) when she testified before the House Un-American Activities Committee and refused to answer questions about her alleged American Communist Party membership.  She maintained her political activism for the rest of her life. In 1954, she ran unsuccessfully for lieutenant governor of New York on the American Labor Party ticket.

After being blacklisted in Hollywood by the studio bosses, she never rebuilt her film acting career.

In the early 1970s, Karen Morley briefly resumed her acting career with guest roles in television series such as Kojak, Kung Fu, and Police Woman.

In 1993, she appeared in The Great Depression, a documentary TV series produced by Henry Hampton's Blackside Productions in association with BBC2 and WGBH. In the series, she talked about how helpless she felt as a privileged Hollywood actress in the face of all the poverty and suffering that surrounded her. She also spoke of her experience making Our Daily Bread and working for King Vidor, whom she described as a conservative who thought that people should willingly help each other without government interference.

In December 1999, at the age of 90, she appeared in Vanity Fair in an article about blacklist survivors, and she was honored at the San Francisco Film Festival.

Personal life
In November 1932, Morley married director Charles Vidor in Santa Ana, California. They were divorced on March 2, 1943. They met on the set of Man About Town, in which Morley played the female lead, and Vidor was co-director. Vidor and Morley had a son, Michael Charles Vidor.

Death
Morley lived in Santa Monica, California during her later years. She died of pneumonia at the age of 93 in Woodland Hills, California.

Partial filmography 

 Thru Different Eyes (1929) as bit part (uncredited)
 Inspiration (1931) as Liane Latour
 Daybreak (1931) as Emily Kessner
 Never the Twain Shall Meet (1931) as Maisie
 Politics (1931) as Myrtle Burns
 High Stakes (1931) as Anne Cornwall
 The Sin of Madelon Claudet (1931) as Alice
 The Cuban Love Song (1931) as Crystal
 Mata Hari (1931) as Carlotta
 Arsene Lupin (1932) as Sonia
 Are You Listening? (1932) as Alice Grimes
 Scarface (1932) as Poppy
 The Man About Town (1932) as Helena
 The Washington Masquerade (1932) as Consuela Fairbanks
 Downstairs (1932) as Karl's New Employer (uncredited)
 The Phantom of Crestwood (1932) as Jenny Wren
 The Mask of Fu Manchu (1932) as Sheila Barton
 Flesh  (1932) as Laura Nash
 Gabriel Over the White House (1933) as Pendola Molloy
 Dinner at Eight (1933) as Mrs. Lucy Talbot
 The Crime Doctor (1934) as Andra
 Our Daily Bread (1934) as Mary Sims
 Straight Is the Way (1934) as Bertha
 Wednesday's Child (1934) as Kathryn Phillips
 Black Fury (1935) as Anna Novak
 $10 Raise (1935) as Emily Converse
 The Healer (1935) as Evelyn Allen
 Thunder in the Night (1935) as Madalaine
 The Littlest Rebel (1935) as Mrs. Cary
 Devil's Squadron (1936) as Martha Dawson
 Beloved Enemy (1936) as Cathleen O'Brien
 Outcast (1937) as Margaret Stevens
 The Girl from Scotland Yard (1937) as Linda Beech
 The Last Train from Madrid (1937) as Baroness Helene Rafitte
 On Such a Night (1937) as Gail Stanley
 Kentucky (1938) as Mrs. Goodwin - 1861
 Pride and Prejudice (1940) as Mrs. Collins
 Jealousy (1945) as Dr. Monica Anderson
 The Unknown (1946) as Rachel Martin Arnold
 The Thirteenth Hour (1947) as Eileen Blair
 Framed (1947) as Beth
 Samson and Delilah (1949) (uncredited)
 M (1951) as Mrs. Coster
 Born to the Saddle (1953) as Kate Daggett

References

The Gettysburg Times, "Discovered", November 3, 1932, Page 7.
Los Angeles Times, "Karen Morley, 93, A Movie Star Until a Congressional Hearing", April 27, 2003, Page N47.

Oakland Tribune, "One Star's Family", September 9, 1935, Page 68.

External links

 

Photographs of Karen Morley

1909 births
2003 deaths
20th-century American actresses
American stage actresses
Actresses from Iowa
American film actresses
American television actresses
Hollywood blacklist
American Labor Party politicians
Deaths from pneumonia in California
People from Ottumwa, Iowa
Metro-Goldwyn-Mayer contract players
WAMPAS Baby Stars
21st-century American women